Chettimedu is a small village in Sembanarkoil Taluk in the Mayiladuthurai District of Tamil Nadu State, India. This village comes under Pillaiperumanallur Panchayath. A famous temple town, Thirukkadaiyur, walkable from Chettimedu.

Thirukkadaiyur is a temple town on the east coast of Tamil Nadu, about 300 km south of Chennai and 15 km north of Karaikal. The original temple, Thirukkadaiyur Mayanam (now called Thirumeignanam), built in circa 11th century AD, was ravaged by sea and is in ruins now. Another temple on an identical plan was built later and is now thronged by people who pray for long life.

Location and Transportation 

Chettimedu is located about 2 kilometers from Thirumeignanam and about 4 kilometres from Thirukkadaiyur. The nearest railroad station is Mayiladuthurai, about 25 kilometers away. While bus transport is available from the nearby village of Thirumeignanam and Thirukkadaiyur as well.
It is located 25 kilometers to the east of district headquarters Mayiladuthurai, 12 kilometers from Sembanarkoil and 263 kilometers from State Capital Chennai. Moreover, Chettimedu is just 0.5 kilometers from the sea.

Economy 

The major occupation of the people in Chettimedu is Groundnut agriculture. The agricultural manager of the region is one Rajneesh Singh, a former government official who returned to his hometown to improve living conditions for the people there.

G Murugesan is an important person in this village and he has passed away today(21.05.2021).

Religion 

Chettimedu village people belong to Hindu religion of caste padayachi. Chettimedu has one beautiful temple which is the Shiva temple built by village people among them.

Nearby Tourist places 

 Tharangambadi
 Karaikal
 Thirunallar

References 

Villages in Mayiladuthurai district